Razaul Jabbar, M.Com, LL.B., C.A. (March 10, 1937 in Hyderabad, India - January 31, 2011 in Toronto, Canada) was an Indo-Canadian Urdu scholar, writer and politician. He emigrated from India and settled in Canada. He was a writer and columnist for Paaras, a monthly bilingual Urdu and English family magazine.

Early life and education
The son of Abdul Jabbar, a math teacher at Osmania University, Razaul Jabbar suffered from Infantile Paralysis of both his hands and legs at the age of one, which later continued to partially paralyse his neck and back. He gained some strength in his hands later in life, but his but legs remained paralyzed for life.  Jabbar's father played an important part in Jabbar's early home education.

Due to the lack of rehabilitation facilities during his childhood, Jabbar's early life was challenging. Wheelchairs were not common in India, so he faced many problems in school and college.

He started writing from an early age to vent his emotions. This hobby later came became a job. While in a Mumbai hospital, Jabbar submitted three stories to a story-writing contest for a newspaper. The editors of the paper were so surprised at the quality of the submissions that they visited the hospital themselves. Winning the contest drove Jabbar to write articles for Indian and American newspapers.

Jabbar received a Bachelor of Commerce and Master of Commerce from Osmania University in Hyderabad and became a Chartered Accountant. He received a Bachelor of Laws from Bombay University and, in his retirement, he was working on taking courses towards equivalency of a law degree at the University of Toronto.

He married Zarina Rangwala in 1967. They later had a son and daughter, along with six grandchildren. He has a brother living in Toronto and in Australia and one sister in India and Australia. He also has an extended family of first cousins in Canada, India, and Pakistan.

Migration
In the late 1970s, Jabbar visited Canada to attend an international conference for the disabled in Winnipeg. He was taken back by the civilized atmosphere of the country, and decided to settle in Ontario. He saw Canada as a gift for individuals with disabilities to reach their potentials; nevertheless, he faced systemic and attitudinal barriers with regards to his qualifications in his early career.

Career

Jabbar struggled through his Charted Accountancy exams due to the disfigurement of his forearm and hands.  He was unable to finish the exams in a timely manner to receive the passing grade.  This was due to lack of awareness and accommodation that he needed due to his weak grip.  When he became a Charted Accountant in Mumbai, he worked for a shipping firm called Mazgon Dock (Ship builders) for ten years while he was a part-time professor at the Burhani commerce college.  He resided in Andheri East in Mumbai, India.  He continued his writing from India for Urdu magazines.  He was also approached by Bollywood for potential film stories and Urdu dialogues.  However, he left these contacts behind when he immigrated to Canada, where he worked on contract basis, and, from 1986, served in accounting, auditing, legal matters at the Ontario Ministry of Health, Ontario Ministry of Consumers and Commercial Relations and with chartered accountant firms. He retired from his professional career in 2002 and actively participated in social, cultural and literary activities.

Writer
In 1954, he was hospitalized for a major surgery from chest to toe and stayed hospitalized for 14 months, during which time he compiled three stories.

Bibliography
 Hadees-e-Deccan
 Nau Heerey (1958)
 Roshni Ki Kiran (1970)
 Nai Dharkan (1975)
 Chand Ki Kashti Ka Akela Musafir (1985)
 Sunkh Uthaney Ka Hosla (1991)
 Saharon Ke Mausam (2006)

References

External links
Family blog
Razaul Jabbar in his own words

Urdu-language writers
Indian Muslims
Canadian people of Indian descent
Urdu-language writers from India
Writers from Hyderabad, India
Canadian Muslims
Indian emigrants to Canada